In Norse mythology, a valkyrie (from Old Norse valkyrja "chooser of the fallen") is one of a host of female figures who decide who will die in battle. Selecting among half of those who die in battle (the other half go to the goddess Freyja's afterlife field Fólkvangr), the valkyries bring their chosen to the afterlife hall of the slain, Valhalla, ruled over by the god Odin. There, when the einherjar are not preparing for the events of Ragnarök, the valkyries bear them mead. Valkyries also appear as lovers of heroes and other mortals, where they are sometimes described as the daughters of royalty, sometimes accompanied by ravens, and sometimes connected to swans.

The Old Norse poems Völuspá, Grímnismál, Darraðarljóð, and the Nafnaþulur section of the Prose Edda book Skáldskaparmál provide lists of valkyrie names. Other valkyrie names appear solely outside these lists, such as Sigrún (who is attested in the poems Helgakviða Hundingsbana I and Helgakviða Hundingsbana II). Valkyrie names commonly emphasize associations with battle and, in many cases, with the spear—a weapon heavily associated with the god Odin. Scholars such as Hilda Ellis Davidson and Rudolf Simek propose that the names of the valkyries themselves contain no individuality, but are rather descriptive of the traits and nature of war-goddesses, and are possibly the descriptive creations of skalds, a type of traditional Scandinavian poet.

Some valkyrie names may be descriptive of the roles and abilities of the valkyries. The valkyrie name Herja may point to an etymological connection to Hariasa, a Germanic goddess attested on a stone from 187 CE. The name Herfjötur has been theorized as pointing to the ability of the valkyries to place fetters, which would connect the valkyries to the earlier Idisi. The name Svipul may be descriptive of the influence the valkyries have over wyrd or ørlog—a Germanic concept of fate.

Valkyrie names

See also
 List of Amazons

Citations

General and cited references 

 Davidson, Hilda Roderick Ellis (1988). Myths and Symbols in Pagan Europe: Early Scandinavian and Celtic Religions. Manchester University Press. 
 Lindow, John (2001). Norse Mythology: A Guide to the Gods, Heroes, Rituals, and Beliefs. Oxford University Press. 
 Haymes, Edward (2010). Wagners Ring in 1848: New Translations of The Nibelung Myth and Siegfried's Death. Camden House.
 Orchard, Andy (1997). Dictionary of Norse Myth and Legend. Cassell. 
 Simek, Rudolf (2007) translated by Angela Hall. Dictionary of Northern Mythology. D.S. Brewer 
 

List
Germanic paganism and mythology lists
Lists of names